Sammatti is a former municipality of Finland. It was consolidated with the city of Lohja in the beginning of 2009.

It is located in the province of Southern Finland and is part of the Uusimaa region.

The municipality is unilingually Finnish.

It was the birthplace of one of Finland's most famous writers, Elias Lönnrot, the compiler of the Kalevala.

Villages
Prior to its consolidation into Lohja in 2009, Sammatti contained of the following villages:

 Haarijärvi (Haarjärvi), Karstu, Kaukola, Kiikala, Leikkilä, Lohilampi, Luskala, Myllykylä, Niemenkylä and Sammatti

References

External links

Official website of Sammatti municipality 
Genealogy of families in Sammatti 

Former municipalities of Finland
Populated places disestablished in 2009
2009 disestablishments in Finland
Lohja